The U.S. state of Ohio has a Supreme Court of seven members, who are elected for six-year terms.

Chief Justice of the Ohio Supreme Court
Six-year term beginning Jan. 1: 1945, 1951, 1957, 1963, 1969, 1975, 1981, 1987, 1993, 1999, 2005, etc.
Elections scheduled: 1944, 1950, 1956, 1962, 1968, 1974, 1980, 1986, 1992, 1998, 2004, etc. (s = Special election held to fill the seat of a justice who did not complete a term.)
BOLD TYPE indicates winning candidate

Candidates for Ohio Supreme Court Justice (1)

Six-year term beginning Jan. 1: 1945, 1951, 1957, 1963, 1969, 1975, 1981, 1987, 1993, 1999, 2005, etc.
Elections scheduled: 1944, 1950, 1956, 1962, 1968, 1974, 1980, 1986, 1992, 1998, 2004, etc. (s = Special election held to fill the seat of a justice who did not complete a term.)
BOLD TYPE indicates winning candidate

Candidates for Ohio Supreme Court Justice (2)

Six-year term beginning Jan. 2: 1945, 1951, 1957, 1963, 1969, 1975, 1981, 1987, 1993, 1999, 2005, etc.
Elections scheduled: 1944, 1950, 1956, 1962, 1968, 1974, 1980, 1986, 1992, 1998, 2004, etc. (s = Special election held to fill the seat of a justice who did not complete a term.)
BOLD TYPE indicates winning candidate

Candidates for Ohio Supreme Court Justice (3)

Six-year term beginning Jan. 1: 1941, 1947, 1953, 1959, 1965, 1971, 1977, 1983, 1989, 1995, 2001, etc.
Elections scheduled: 1940, 1946, 1952, 1958, 1964, 1970, 1976, 1982, 1988, 1994, 2000, etc. (s = Special election held to fill the seat of a justice who did not complete a term.)
BOLD TYPE indicates winning candidate

Candidates for Ohio Supreme Court Justice (4)

Six-year term beginning Jan. 2: 1941, 1947, 1953, 1959, 1965, 1971, 1977, 1983, 1989, 1995, 2001, etc.
Elections scheduled: 1940, 1946, 1952, 1958, 1964, 1970, 1976, 1982, 1988, 1994, 2000, etc. (s = Special election held to fill the seat of a justice who did not complete a term.)
BOLD TYPE indicates winning candidate

Candidates for Ohio Supreme Court Justice (5)

Six-year term beginning Jan. 1: 1943, 1949, 1955, 1961, 1967, 1973, 1979, 1985, 1991, 1997, 2003, etc.
Elections scheduled: 1942, 1948, 1954, 1960, 1966, 1972, 1978, 1984, 1990, 1996, 2002, etc. (s = Special election held to fill the seat of a justice who did not complete a term.)
BOLD TYPE indicates winning candidate

Candidates for Ohio Supreme Court Justice (6)

Six-year term beginning Jan. 2: 1943, 1949, 1955, 1961, 1967, 1973, 1979, 1985, 1991, 1997, 2003, etc.
Elections scheduled: 1942, 1948, 1954, 1960, 1966, 1972, 1978, 1984, 1990, 1996, 2002, etc. (s = Special election held to fill the seat of a justice who did not complete a term.)
BOLD TYPE indicates winning candidate

First Constitution of Ohio (1803-1851)

Under the first constitution, joint sessions of the legislature elected judges to seven-year terms. Elections were generally in January, with judges seated in February. The state had three or four judges through this period.

Second Constitution of Ohio (1851-1912)

Under the second constitution, five judges were elected to five-year terms, with one seat elected each autumn. The first election was autumn of 1851, with the top five candidates assigned terms by lot. Chief Justice was not voted separately, but chosen by other means. Change of law added a sixth judge for the 1892 election, with term starting February 1893, and terms were increased to six years. No elections were held in 1906 or 1907, when the state transitioned to electing two judges each in even numbered years and terms of sitting judges were extended to fit the new schedule.

Candidates for first election, October 1851:

Candidates for Ohio Supreme Court Judge (1)

Five-year term beginning February: 1857, 1862, 1867, 1872, 1877, 1882, 1887, 1892, 1897
Elections scheduled: 1856, 1861, 1866, 1871, 1876, 1881, 1886, 1891, 1896 (s = Special election held to fill the seat of a justice who did not complete a term.)
BOLD TYPE indicates winning candidate

Candidates for Ohio Supreme Court Judge (2)

Five-year term beginning February: 1856, 1861, 1866, 1871, 1876, 1881, 1886, 1891, 1896
Elections scheduled: 1855, 1860, 1865, 1870, 1875, 1880, 1885, 1890, 1895 (s = Special election held to fill the seat of a justice who did not complete a term.)
BOLD TYPE indicates winning candidate

Candidates for Ohio Supreme Court Judge (3)

Five-year term beginning February: 1855, 1860, 1865, 1870, 1875, 1880, 1885, 1890, 1895
Elections scheduled: 1854, 1859, 1864, 1869, 1874, 1879, 1884, 1889, 1894 (s = Special election held to fill the seat of a justice who did not complete a term.)
BOLD TYPE indicates winning candidate

Candidates for Ohio Supreme Court Judge (4)

Five-year term beginning February: 1854, 1859, 1864, 1869, 1874, 1879, 1884, 1889, 1894
Elections scheduled: 1853, 1858, 1863, 1868, 1873, 1878, 1883, 1888, 1893 (s = Special election held to fill the seat of a justice who did not complete a term.)
BOLD TYPE indicates winning candidate

Candidates for Ohio Supreme Court Judge (5)

Five-year term beginning February: 1853, 1858, 1863, 1868, 1873, 1878, 1883, 1888, 1893
Elections scheduled: 1852, 1857, 1862, 1867, 1872, 1877, 1882, 1887, 1892 (s = Special election held to fill the seat of a justice who did not complete a term.)
BOLD TYPE indicates winning candidate

Candidates for Ohio Supreme Court Judge (6)

Five-year term beginning February: 1893, six-year terms beginning 1898, 1904
Elections scheduled: 1892, 1897, 1903 (s = Special election held to fill the seat of a justice who did not complete a term.)
BOLD TYPE indicates winning candidate

Notes

References
Election Results from Ohio Secretary of State

Ohio Supreme Court
Supreme Court